Du har det där is the debut studio album by Swedish dansband Grönwalls. It was released on 29 October 1992. Being the band's debut album, it was nominated for a Grammis Award. The songs "Du har det där" and "Du ringde från Flen" also became Svensktoppen hit songs.

Track listing
Du har det där (Bert Månsson)
Ett ärligt svar (Jack Johansen-Eva Andersson)
Limon Limonero (Carlos Imperial-Stig Olin)
Hand i hand med kärleken (Bert Månsson)
Achy Breaky Heart (Donald Von Tress)
I motvind (Michael Saxell)
Intill mig (Real World) (Lothar Krell-Maggie Reilly-Gavin Hodgson-Stewart McKillop-Michael Persson)
Du, jag och kärleken (Mats Andersson)
Kär i dig (Touch the Sky) (Carl-Axel Gårdebäck-Gunnar Johansson-Lars Sandberg)
Du ringde från Flen (Ulf Nordqvist)
Jag skall bygga en bro (Michael Saxell)
Hela natten lång (Hele natten lang) (Anders Valbro-Monia Sjöström-Mikael Andersen)
Om en stund (Calle Kindbom-Per-Ola Pettersson)
För den kärlek jag känner (When Your Heartache is Over) (Tim Norell-Oson-Alexander Bard-Keith Almgren)

Personnel
Monia Sjöström - vocals
Mikael Andersen – acoustic guitar, vocals
Jonas Nilsson - guitar
Niclas Brandt – keyboard, vocals
Sid Andersson - bass, vocals
Peter Clarinsson - drums

References 

1992 debut albums
Grönwalls albums
Swedish-language albums